"Back" is a song co-written and recorded by American country rap artist Colt Ford. It is a duet with Jake Owen, and the second single from Ford's fourth studio album, Declaration of Independence.

Critical reception
Ashley Cooke of Roughstock gave it a full 5 stars, saying that the song "genuinely tugs at your heart -strings. If you were lucky enough to grow up with memories similar to the lyrics in this song, you will find yourself in love with it just as I did." Billy Dukes of Taste of Country gave it 2.5 stars out of 5, saying that it was "about a verse too long" and that it "isn't a step backward, but it's no step forward."

Chart performance

References

2012 singles
2012 songs
Colt Ford songs
Jake Owen songs
Male vocal duets
Average Joes Entertainment singles
Songs written by Noah Gordon (singer)
Songs written by Colt Ford